Hudspeth is a surname and may refer to:

A. James Hudspeth, F.M. Kirby Professor at Rockefeller University
Adam Hudspeth (1836–1890), Canadian lawyer and politician
Charles Hudspeth (activist) (1918–1999), civil rights leader from San Antonio, Texas
Charles Hudspeth (convict), American man convicted of murder in Marion County, Arkansas in 1887
Cindy Lee Hudspeth (1958–1978), American murder victim
Claude Benton Hudspeth (1877–1941), American rancher, lawyer, and statesman from El Paso, Texas
Frank Hudspeth (1890–1963), English footballer, played for Newcastle United for 19 years, captain 1923–1926
Harry Lee Hudspeth (born 1935), United States federal judge
Mark Hudspeth (born 1968), current head football coach at the University of Louisiana at Lafayette
Robert Hudspeth (1894–1935), American Negro League baseball player
Tommy Hudspeth, football coach at both the collegiate and professional levels

Notes

English toponymic surnames
English-language surnames
Surnames of English origin
Surnames of British Isles origin